German submarine U-532 was a Type IXC U-boat of Nazi Germany's Kriegsmarine during World War II.

She was laid down at the Deutsche Werft (yard) in Hamburg as yard number 347 on 7 January 1942, launched on 26 August and commissioned on 11 November with Kapitänleutnant Ottoheinrich Junker in command.

U-532 began her service career with training as part of the 4th U-boat Flotilla from 11 November 1942. She was reassigned to the 2nd flotilla for operations on 1 April 1943, then the 33rd flotilla on 1 October 1944.

She carried out four patrols, sank eight ships and damaged two others. She was a member of three wolfpacks.

She surrendered on 13 May 1945 at Loch Eriboll in Scotland; she was then transferred to Loch Ryan for Operation Deadlight. She was sunk on 9 December 1945.

Design
German Type IXC/40 submarines were slightly larger than the original Type IXCs. U-532 had a displacement of  when at the surface and  while submerged. She had two shafts and two  propellers.

U-532 was fitted with six  torpedo tubes (four fitted at the bow and two at the stern), 22 torpedoes, one  SK C/32 naval gun, 180 rounds, and a  SK C/30 as well as a  C/30 anti-aircraft gun. The boat had a complement of forty-eight.

Service history

First patrol
The boat departed Kiel on 25 March 1943, moved through the North Sea, negotiated the gap between Iceland and the Faroe Islands and entered the Atlantic Ocean. There, east of Greenland, she was intercepted by the escorts of Convoy ONS 5 and damaged in a 15-hour engagement.

She entered Lorient on the French Atlantic coast on 15 May 1943.

Second patrol
Her second foray involved a move to the Far East. Departing Lorient on 3 July 1943, she had rounded Africa by the 27th and entered the Indian Ocean. On 19 September she sank Fort Longueuil southwest of the Chagos Archipelago (south southwest of the Indian mainland). Two Indian crewmen, the only survivors, came ashore on a raft in Sumatra, after spending 134 days adrift; they became prisoners of the Japanese on 1 February 1944.

U-532 went on to sink other ships, such as the Tashina, (using the deck gun) on 1 October 1943, northeast of the Maldive Islands. She also damaged British Purpose south of Mangalore on the 20th. This ship fell out of line in her convoy after being hit; the following vessel in the line, the California Standard, struck her a glancing blow but the damage was slight.

The submarine docked in Penang, in Malaya (now Malaysia) on 30 October 1943. She was in the first wave of U-boats in the newly formed Monsun Gruppe operating out of Japanese-occupied Penang.

Third patrol
The pickings continued to be rich; amongst other victims, she sank Tulagi northeast of Cape Comorin in southern India on 27 March 1944. The ship capsized and sank in less than 30 seconds.

U-532 moved from Penang to Singapore in May 1944 and on to Batavia (now Jakarta in Indonesia) in December.

Fourth patrol
For her fourth sortie, the boat sank Baron Jedburgh on 10 March 1945 and the Oklahoma on the 28th. She returned to Europe in May following the German capitulation.

Fate

The submarine docked at Liverpool on 10 May 1945 before moving to Loch Eriboll and to Loch Ryan (both in Scotland) on the 17th, for Operation Deadlight.

Summary of raiding history

References

Bibliography

External links

German Type IX submarines
U-boats commissioned in 1942
U-boats sunk in 1945
World War II submarines of Germany
1942 ships
World War II shipwrecks in the Atlantic Ocean
Ships built in Hamburg
Operation Deadlight
Maritime incidents in December 1945